Grallipeza is a genus of stilt-legged flies in the family Micropezidae. There are at least 40 described species in Grallipeza.

Species
These 47 species belong to the genus Grallipeza:

 Grallipeza abeja g
 Grallipeza acutivitta (Hendel, 1936) c g
 Grallipeza affinis Hennig, 1934 c g
 Grallipeza albiterga g
 Grallipeza amazonica (Enderlein, 1922) c
 Grallipeza arcuata Hennig, 1934 c g
 Grallipeza auriornata Hennig, 1934 c g
 Grallipeza baracoa (Cresson, 1926) c
 Grallipeza callangana Enderlein, 1922 c g
 Grallipeza cantata Cresson, 1926 c g
 Grallipeza cliffi g
 Grallipeza cristulata Cresson, 1926 c g
 Grallipeza ecuadoriensis Enderlein, 1922 c g
 Grallipeza elegans Hennig, 1934 c g
 Grallipeza flavicaudata Cresson, 1926 c g
 Grallipeza footei Cresson, 1926 c g
 Grallipeza gracilis Hennig, 1934 c g
 Grallipeza grenada g
 Grallipeza hyaloptera Hendel, 1936 c g
 Grallipeza imbecilla Enderlein, 1922 c g
 Grallipeza magna Hennig, 1934 c g
 Grallipeza marleyi g
 Grallipeza mellea Williston, 1896 c g
 Grallipeza nebulosa Loew, 1866 c g b
 Grallipeza nigrinotata Hennig, 1934 c g
 Grallipeza nigrivitta g
 Grallipeza obscura Hennig, 1934 c g
 Grallipeza ornatithorax Enderlein, 1922 c g
 Grallipeza pallidefasciata Macquart, 1855 c g
 Grallipeza panamensis Cresson, 1926 c g
 Grallipeza paraplacida g
 Grallipeza perezi g
 Grallipeza placida Loew, 1866 c g
 Grallipeza placidoides (Cresson, 1926) g
 Grallipeza placioides Cresson, 1926 c g
 Grallipeza pleuritica Johnson, 1894 c g
 Grallipeza pronigra Hennig, 1934 c g
 Grallipeza pseudosimplex Hennig, 1934 c g
 Grallipeza pulchrifrons Cresson, 1926 c g
 Grallipeza russula Wulp, 1897 c g
 Grallipeza scurra Enderlein, 1922 c g
 Grallipeza spinuliger Cresson, 1926 c g
 Grallipeza suavis Enderlein, 1922 c g
 Grallipeza turba g
 Grallipeza unifasciata Fabricius, 1805 c g
 Grallipeza unimaculata Macquart, 1846 c g
 Grallipeza vicina Hennig, 1934 c g

Data sources: i = ITIS, c = Catalogue of Life, g = GBIF, b = Bugguide.net

References

Further reading

External links

 
 

Micropezidae
Nerioidea genera
Taxa named by Camillo Rondani